"Soldier, Soldier" is a song recorded by the German eurodance group Captain Jack. It was released in May 1996 as the third single from their album, The Mission. The song had a great success in many countries, particularly in the Czech Republic and the Netherlands where it peaked at number 3. The song also reached number 6 in Finland and number 11 in Germany. On the Eurochart Hot 100, "Soldier, Soldier" reached number 19. 

The song has connection with the traditional ballad "Soldier, Soldier".

Music video
The music video was directed by Mark Glaeser and filmed on the island of Saint Barthélemy.

Charts

Weekly charts

Year-end charts

References

Songs about soldiers
Songs about the military
1996 singles
1996 songs
Captain Jack (band) songs
Music videos directed by Mark Glaeser